Syneora is a genus of moths in the family Geometridae erected by Alfred Jefferis Turner in 1917. All the species are found in Australia.

Species
Syneora cheleuta (Meyrick, 1892)
Syneora leucanthes (Turner, 1947)
Syneora excursaria (Walker, [1863])
Syneora euboliaria (Walker, 1860)
Syneora mundifera (Walker, 1860)
Syneora silicaria (Guenée, 1857)
Syneora praecisa (Turner, 1917)
Syneora lithina (Warren, 1897)
Syneora emmelodes (Turner, 1904)
Syneora hemeropa (Meyrick, 1892)
Syneora nigrilinea Goldfinch, 1944
Syneora amphiclina (Meyrick, 1892)
Syneora fractata (Walker, 1862)
Syneora gypsochroa (Turner, 1947)
Syneora adelphodes (Meyrick, 1892)
Syneora cymatomita (Turner, 1947)
Syneora mesochra (Turner, 1947)
Syneora strixata (Walker, 1862)
Syneora acclinis (Turner, 1947)
Syneora odontosticha (Turner, 1947)
Syneora acrotypa (Turner, 1917)

References

Boarmiini